Frank Owens Smith (August 27, 1859 – January 29, 1924) was a businessman and served in the U.S. House of Representatives.

Early life
Frank Owens Smith was born on August 27, 1859, in Smithville (now Dunkirk, Maryland) to Ruth Ellen (née Owens) and John Sparrow Smith. Smith attended the private and public schools of Calvert County, Maryland, and also the North Mount Institute of West Virginia, and Bethel Military Academy of Virginia.

Personal life
Smith married Lillie Griffith on March 25, 1885.

Career
Smith served in the Internal Revenue Service at Baltimore, Maryland during the first Cleveland administration until 1889.

Smith organized the Calumet Canning Company in 1889 and engaged in a general merchandise business in 1890.  He later engaged in manufacturing flour and feed from 1898 to 1910.  He was appointed State Tobacco Inspector by Governor Edwin Warfield in 1904 and was re-appointed in 1906. He was an unsuccessful candidate for election to the Maryland State Senate in 1911.  He served as chief engrossing clerk of the State Senate in 1911.

In May 1912, Smith was elected from the fifth district of Maryland as a Democrat to the Sixty-third Congress, and served from March 4, 1913, to March 3, 1915.  He was an unsuccessful candidate for renomination in 1914 and 1918. He instead engaged in fruit growing in Dunkirk until his death.

Death
Smith died on January 29, 1924, at his home in Dunkirk. He is interred in Mount Zion Cemetery of Lothian, Maryland.

References

External links

 
 

1859 births
1924 deaths
Internal Revenue Service people
Democratic Party members of the United States House of Representatives from Maryland
People from Calvert County, Maryland